Dita is an Australian television series which aired from 1967 to 1970 on what would eventually become Network Ten. The daytime series featured Dita Cobb and Noel Brophy, who would discuss news items. Produced in Sydney, part of the run was also shown in Melbourne. The series aired in a 30-minute time-slot.

Prior to this series, Dita Cobb had appeared on Dita and Buzz.

References

External links
Dita at IMDb

1967 Australian television series debuts
1970 Australian television series endings
Network 10 original programming
Black-and-white Australian television shows
English-language television shows
Australian television talk shows